Islands High School is a public high school located on Whitemarsh Island in unincorporated Chatham County, Georgia, United States, east of Savannah (with a Savannah postal address). The school is part of the Savannah-Chatham County Public Schools, and its basic attendance zone covers the urbanized Georgia barrier islands of Whitemarsh, Wilmington, Talahi, and Tybee. The school is accredited by the Southern Association of Colleges and Schools and the Georgia Accrediting Commission. It is also home to the Savannah-Chatham school district's Scientific Research and Veterinary Science Specialty programs.

History 
Islands High School was started in 2010 to fill the need of a high school for the growing number of students on Whitemarsh, Wilmington, Talahi, and Tybee Islands. The school used the building previously occupied by Coastal Middle School. Coastal Middle shifted to the Islands Elementary building, and Islands Elementary was closed. Danielle Pinkerton was principal from the school's inception to 2014.

In 2012, Islands teacher Allison Konter was named SCCPSS district teacher of the year.

In 2013, Islands started its first junior varsity football team, and in 2014 it started its first varsity football team.

The principal of Islands High School as of August 2020 is Derrick Butler.

In 2016, Islands was one of five Georgia schools to win an AP Champion Award.

In 2020, Islands teacher Megan Heberle was awarded the Presidential Awards for Excellence in Mathematics and Science Teaching (PAEMST).

Student activities

Academic competitions

 Mock Trial Team
 Literary Quiz Bowl
 GHSA Literary Competition

Athletics

 Baseball
 Basketball
 Cheerleading 
 Cross country
 Football
 Golf
 Lacrosse
 Soccer 
 Softball
 Swimming
 Tennis
 Track
 Volleyball
 Wrestling

Clubs and organizations

 Chorus
 Concert Band
 Drama Club
 French Club
 Future Business Leaders of America
 Future Farmers of America
 Jazz Band (spring)
 Marching Band (fall/winter)
 National Honor Society
 Parent Teacher Student Association
 Student Leadership Program
 Student Senate
 Symphonic Band
 Tri-M National Music Honor Society
 GLOW Club/GSA

References

External links
 

Public high schools in Georgia (U.S. state)
Educational institutions established in 1956
Schools in Chatham County, Georgia
1956 establishments in Georgia (U.S. state)